Arnaud Bouquet is a Canadian documentary filmmaker and cinematographer. He is most noted for his film Last of the Elephant Men, for which he won the Canadian Screen Award for Best Cinematography in a Documentary at the 4th Canadian Screen Awards in 2016.

References

External links

Canadian cinematographers
Canadian documentary film directors
Film directors from Quebec
Living people
Year of birth missing (living people)
Best Cinematography in a Documentary Canadian Screen Award winners